Jinchuan District is a district of and the seat of the city of Jinchang, Gansu province of the People's Republic of China.

Administrative divisions
Six subdistricts:
Binhelu, Guilinlu, Beijinglu, Jinchuanlu, Xinhualu, Guangzhoulu

Two towns:
Ningyuanbu, Shuangwan

See also
 List of administrative divisions of Gansu

References

Jinchuan District
Jinchang